Tiffany Chan, born Chan Zhi Cheng, (born 12 September 1993) is a professional golfer from Hong Kong.

Chan attended Daytona State College where she was a two-time NJCAA champion. She played for the University of Southern California in 2016 and 2017.

Chan played on the Hong Kong team in the Espirito Santo Trophy (World Amateur Team Championship) three times (2010, 2012, 2014) and the Asian Games twice (2010, 2014).

In 2016, Chan won the Hong Kong Ladies Open on the Ladies Asian Golf Tour.

Chan qualified for the 2016 Summer Olympics.

Chan turned professional in 2017 and competed on the Symetra Tour. She earned her 2018 LPGA Tour card through qualifying school.

Amateur wins
2010 Hong Kong Ladies Close, Hong Kong Junior Open
2011 Hong Kong Close Amateur, Faldo Series (Hong Kong) Qualifying
2012 Hong Kong Ladies Close, Jack Kramer Memorial, China Amateur Open
2013 Hatter Classic
2014 North Florida Invitational, JMU Eagle Landing Invite, MSU Ocala Spring Invitational, NJCAA National Championship, World University Championship, LPGA Xavier Invitational, FIU Pat Bradley Invitational
2015 FGCU Eagle Invitational, Hurricane Invitational, MSU Ocala Spring Invitational, NJCAA Region 8 Championship, NJCAA National Championship

Source:

Professional wins
2015 TLPGA Future Open (LPGA of Taiwan, as an amateur)
2016 Hong Kong Ladies Open (Ladies Asian Golf Tour, as an amateur)

Team appearances
Espirito Santo Trophy (representing Hong Kong): 2008, 2010, 2012, 2014, 2016
Patsy Hankins Trophy (representing Asia/Pacific): 2016 (winners)

References

External links

Hong Kong female golfers
LPGA Tour golfers
Olympic golfers of Hong Kong
Golfers at the 2016 Summer Olympics
Golfers at the 2020 Summer Olympics
USC Trojans women's golfers
Golfers at the 2010 Asian Games
Golfers at the 2014 Asian Games
Asian Games competitors for Hong Kong
1993 births
Living people